Whitkirk is a suburb of east Leeds, England. It is situated between Cross Gates to the north, Austhorpe to the east, Killingbeck to the west, Colton to the south-east and Halton to the south-west. The Temple Newsam estate lies directly south of the area.

It falls into the Temple Newsam ward of Leeds City Council and Leeds East parliamentary constituency.

History

A church is recorded in The Domesday Survey (1086) as belonging to the manor of Gipton and Colton, and as Whitkirk is the only known medieval church in these area of Leeds, it is reasonable to assume that it is Whitkirk church that is being referred to, in which case it must have a late Anglo- Saxon origin at least. The first mention of Whitkirk itself is in 1154–66 in the Early Yorkshire Charters as ‘Witechirche’, meaning ‘white church’. The name has Old English origins, with the ‘chirche’ element subsequently being replaced by the Old Norse ‘kirkja’. It is possible that the church was the focus of settlement activity at this period extending into the later medieval.

The renowned civil engineer John Smeaton was born in the local parish of Austhorpe and is buried in Whitkirk churchyard.

Information
Whitkirk is 4 miles east of Leeds city centre, and about 1 mile from Cross Gates Railway Station, which has services to Leeds City station and York railway station, and is close to the A63 dual carriageway and M1 motorway, meaning it is an ideal location for commuters. The area is well served by regular buses. 

The area has a cricket club which has a large cricket pitch, five tennis courts, a football pitch and a crown green bowling green, along with a large bar area. Housing in Whitkirk ranges from detached houses, semi-detached houses and terraced houses. It is also home to a Premier Inn, directly next to the Brown Cow public house, a gym, a Co-op, a carpet shop, an undertaker and an estate agent. The Temple Newsam War Memorial can be found a few hundred yards along Selby road towards Halton.

Education
Whitkirk has three schools, Whitkirk Primary School, Temple Newsam Halton Primary School, and Temple Moor High School.

Comparison

Whitkirk lies within the LS15 postcode area. Here is a population breakdown of the postcode area in comparison with the UK population.

Location grid

See also
Listed buildings in Leeds (Temple Newsam Ward)

References

External links
 Community webpage
 Whitkirk Cricket Club
 Genuki site

Places in Leeds